New Hope Rosenwald School is a Rosenwald School near Fredonia, Alabama. It was built in 1915. It was listed on the National Register of Historic Places as part of The Rosenwald School Building Fund and Associated Buildings Multiple Property Submission on November 29, 2001.

References

School buildings on the National Register of Historic Places in Alabama
National Register of Historic Places in Chambers County, Alabama
School buildings completed in 1915
Rosenwald schools in Alabama
Historically segregated African-American schools in Alabama
1915 establishments in Arkansas